Markus Schirmer (born 10 June 1963) is an Austrian pianist.

Schirmer is a professor at the University of Music and Performing Arts, Graz, where he teaches concert piano.

Discography
 Pictures & Reflections (Maurice Ravel: Miroirs, Modest Mussorgsky: Pictures at an Exhibition) Tacet 2005, T 132
 Ludwig van Beethoven: Early Piano Sonatas, Op. 13 Pathétique; Op. 2, No. 2 and Op. 2, No. 3; Tacet 2003, T 128
 W. A. Mozart: The Piano Quartets, Tacet 2002
 Franz Schubert: Piano sonatas D 625 F minor, D 845 A minor, Lotus Records
 Joseph Haydn: Piano Sonatas Vol. 1, Lotus Records
 Markus Schirmer and Wolfram Berger – Engel im Kopf
 Scurdia – Risgar Koshnaw: My songs from Kurdistan
 Ludwig van Beethoven: Piano Sonatas: Nos. 13, 14 (Moonlight), 19, 20. Piano Sonatinas: in G, in F. Variations on a Swiss Song, Tacet 2011, T194
 W. A. Mozart: The Mozart Sessions: Concerto No. 12, K. 414, Concerto No. 13, K. 415, Church Sonata, K. 336; Paladino 2012

References

External links 

  - Official Website
 O.Univ.Prof. Markus Schirmer University of Music and Performing Arts Graz
 Official website Scurdia Markus Schirmer & Friends
 "'Rattenfänger' am Klavier mit Mozart als Köder" by Peter Vujica, Der Standard 19 April 2006
 "Markus Schirmer zu Gast im Café Graz" by Andrea Harrich, City of Graz, 23 December 2013
 Josef Krainer Award 2014
 Profile at styriarte
 

Austrian classical pianists
Male classical pianists
Musicians from Graz
1963 births
Living people
Austrian music educators
Academic staff of the University of Music and Performing Arts Graz
21st-century classical pianists
21st-century male musicians